Wietlin  (Vetlyn) is a village in the administrative district of Gmina Laszki, within Jarosław County, Subcarpathian Voivodeship, in south-eastern Poland.

References

Wietlin